Far from the Maddening Crowds is the debut studio album by British electronic music artist Chicane, released on 20 October 1997 through Xtravaganza Recordings. It is highly regarded as a seminal release in the trance music community, and was highly sought after, having been shelved for licensing issues, until its re-release on 18 October 2007. The album includes Chicane's debut single, "Offshore", as well as other singles "Sunstroke", "Lost You Somewhere" and "Red Skies". The album charted in the UK on release, peaking at number 49.

Background
Chicane was originally formed as an electronic music duo under the name Disco Citizens, comprising Nick Bracegirdle and Leo Elstob. The duo released their debut single, "Right Here, Right Now", in 1995 through Deconstruction Records to success, with the song reaching number 40 in the UK Singles Chart. Chicane was intended as a side project of the act, however they only saw one release as a duo, the Offshore EP through Cyanide Records. After "Offshore"'s release as a single in 1996, the song quickly garnered success, debuting at number 1 on the UK Dance Singles Chart. After this Elstob left the duo, and Chicane (and Disco Citizens) became the solo moniker of Nick Bracegirdle. He soon signed to Alex Gold's record label, Xtravaganza Recordings, who showed interest in releasing a full album by Chicane.

Release
"Offshore", the earliest song produced and released, is also among the best-known of Chicane's tracks; aside from single sales and being a major dance club hit, resulting on its inclusion on what has been said to be over 130 compilation albums. It has also been featured in the UK on TV programs ranging from travel reviews to the BBC's Gardener's World and Grandstand.

The album was released on 20 October 1997 through Xtravaganza recordings, with singles "Offshore", "Sunstroke" on 2 June 1997, and "Lost You Somewhere" on 8 December 1997. A vocal edit of "Offshore", titled "Offshore '97", was mixed by Anthony Pappa and credited as a collaboration with Power Circle. It was released as a single on 1 September 1997 and was featured on the album. A Benelux single release of "Red Skies" was also issued in 1998. After its release, the album appeared on the UK Albums Chart for one week, reaching number 49. In 2007, after its re-release, the album appeared on the UK Dance Albums Chart for one week, peaking at number 36.

Critical reception

Far from the Maddening Crowds received positive reviews from critics upon and after its release. Stephen Thomas Erlewine from Allmusic reviewed the album in 1997, and praised its variety, writing that "Chicane has mastered not only house-styled thumpers, but also spacious, near-ambient soundscapes". He summarised the review describing the album as "cinematic" and "a successful debut", rating it four stars out of five. Will Alexander from Trance Critic reviewed the album in 2007, summarising it with "Far from the Maddening Crowds is still as relevant and inspiring as the day it was created", and rated it five stars out of five.

Track listing

Personnel
Adapted from liner notes

Nick Bracegirdle – songwriting, production
Leo Elstob – songwriting on "Offshore" and "Offshore '97", production on "Offshore"
Caroline Lavelle – songwriting and vocals on "Lost You Somewhere"
Salt Tank – songwriting and production on "Leaving Town"
Luce Drayton – vocals on "Sunstroke"
Richie Sullivan – songwriting on "Offshore '97"
Graham Dear – songwriting on "Offshore '97"
Louise Burton – songwriting on "Offshore '97"
Anthony Pappa – mixing on "Offshore '97"
Walter Coelho – mastering
Alex Gold – executive producer

Charts

References

1997 debut albums
Chicane (musician) albums